Samarth may refer to: 
Samarth-class offshore patrol vessel
Mukherjee-Samarth family
Swami Samarth, Indian guru
Ravikumar Samarth, Indian cricketer
Nitin Samarth, American physicist
Shobhna Samarth, Indian actress
Tanuja Samarth, Indian actress
Shri Samarth High School, Amravati, Indian high school
Samarth Ramdas, Indian saint
Samarth Vyas, Indian cricketer
Kumarsen Samarth, Indian filmmaker